This is a list of submissions to the 49th Academy Awards for Best Foreign Language Film. The Academy Award for Best Foreign Language Film was created in 1956 by the Academy of Motion Picture Arts and Sciences to honour non-English-speaking films produced outside the United States. The award is handed out annually, and is accepted by the winning film's director, although it is considered an award for the submitting country as a whole. Countries are invited by the Academy to submit their best films for competition according to strict rules, with only one film being accepted from each country.

For the 49th Academy Awards, twenty-four films were submitted in the category Academy Award for Best Foreign Language Film. Japan failed to submit a film, for the first and only time while East Germany received its only nomination ever for Jacob the Liar. The highlighted titles were the five nominated films, which came from the Ivory Coast, East Germany, France, Italy and Poland. The Ivory Coast became the first sub-Saharan African country to submit a film to the competition, and it ended up winning the Oscar for the dark comedy Black and White in Color. It is likely the film would not have even been accepted under today's rules, since the director was French and the film was a majority French production.

Submissions

References

Sources
 Margaret Herrick Library, Academy of Motion Picture Arts and Sciences

49